Antal van der Duim and Boy Westerhof were the defending champions and defended their title against Gero Kretschmer and Alexander Satschko 6–3, 6–3.

Seeds

Draw

References
 Main Draw

Sport 1 Open - Doubles
2013 Doubles